The debye (symbol: D) is a unit of electric dipole moment named after physicist Peter J. W. Debye

Debye may also refer to:
 Peter Debye (1884–1966), Dutch physicist, physical chemist and Nobel laureate in Chemistry
30852 Debye, a main-belt asteroid named after Peter Debye
Debye (crater), a lunar crater named after Peter Debye
List of things named after Peter Debye

See also
De Bie (more common form of the Dutch surname)